Taniela Moa (11 March 1985 – 16 December 2021) was a Tongan rugby union player. He last played for Section Paloise. He also played for the Blues and Chiefs in Super Rugby, and Auckland and Bay of Plenty in the NPC. His main position was scrum-half but he could also cover the fly-half position.

Moa was born in Tonga before moving to Auckland, where he was educated at Onehunga High School and Southern Cross Campus before finishing his last year at De La Salle College, Mangere East.

He represented the Ikale Tahi at the 2011 Rugby World Cup. He won a total of 20 caps for Tonga.

Moa died at the age of 36 on 16 December 2021.

References

External links
Blues profile
 

1985 births
2021 deaths
Auckland rugby union players
Bay of Plenty rugby union players
Blues (Super Rugby) players
Rugby union scrum-halves
Tonga national rugby league team players
Tongan rugby union players
Tonga international rugby union players
Chiefs (rugby union) players
Tongan expatriate rugby union players
Expatriate rugby union players in New Zealand
Tongan expatriate sportspeople in New Zealand
People educated at De La Salle College, Māngere East
People from Haʻapai
People educated at Onehunga High School